Uttarakaanda is a 2017 Kannada novel by novelist S.L. Bhyrappa, based on the Sanskrit epic, Ramayana. This book was released on 16 January 2017.

Release history
The novel was released on 16 January 2017 and it sold out in a few hours. The publisher announced that they would release a second and third impression immediately. The size of the print run was not disclosed.

References

External links
 slbhyrappa.in

Kannada novels
2017 Indian novels
Novels by S. L. Bhyrappa